Carakale Brewery is a Jordanian microbrewery founded in 2010 in the town of Fuheis near Amman by Yazan Karadsheh, a member of the local Christian community. The brewery is named after Caracal, a mammal that is native to Jordan.

History
Carakale was Jordan's first microbrewery and its first production beer was a blond ale of the same name intended to serve as entry-level brew for the Jordanian domestic market, which was unacquainted with craft beer culture.

The brewery sold its first bottle in late 2013, was producing 40,000 bottles a month by mid-2014, and was available in most of the approximately 600 stores, bars, restaurants, and hotels that sell alcohol in Jordan by late 2017.

Carakale has collaborating with several US breweries, including the Arizona Wilderness Brewing Company, with which it made a Dead Sea-salted and grapefruit-flavoured Gose beer, "Dead Sea-rious", and the Against The Grain Brewery, with which it produced a fig and chamomile Pilsner and a za'atar-spiced Saison.

References

External links
Official website

See also
Jordanian cuisine
Jordanian wine

Alcohol in Jordan
Jordanian alcoholic drinks
Beer in Jordan